Nico Fidenco (artistic name Domenico Colarossi; 24 January 1933 – 19 November 2022) was an Italian singer and film soundtrack composer who gained considerable popularity in 1960 with the release of the song "What a Sky" (Italian: "Su nel cielo"), taken from the film Silver Spoon Set by Francesco Maselli.

Self-taught in music, Fidenco did a few cover versions of film title songs for the Italian market. With the song "Legata a un granello di sabbia", he was the first Italian singer to sell one million copies of a single.  This interest in cinema led him to be a prolific soundtrack composer, including scores for westerns and many Joe D'Amato films.

Selected filmography

Discography

45 rpm singles
 1960 What a Sky / Su nel cielo  RCA Italiana 45N 1109
 1961 Just that Same Old Line / Trust Me  RCA Italiana 45N 1122
 1961 Non è vero / Una voce d'angelo  RCA Italiana 45N 1127
 1961 Il mondo di Suzie Wong / Tornerai... Suzie  RCA Italiana 45N 1144
 1961 Ghinza Street / Ghinza Street (strumentale)  RCA Italiana 45N 1155
 1961 Legata a un granello di sabbia / Ridi, ridi  RCA Italiana PM45-1166
 1961 Exodus / Come nasce un amore  RCA Serie Europa PM45-3000
 1962 Little Grain of Sand / Ridi, ridi  RCA Italiana PM45-3033
 1962 La scala di seta / Tra le piume di una rondine  RCA Serie Europa PM45-3042
 1962 Colazione da Tiffany (Moon River) / Audrey  RCA Victor Serie Europa PM45-3044
 1962 Lasciami il tuo sorriso / C'è una leggenda  RCA Victor Serie Europa PM45-3099
 1963 Tutta la gente / Lejos me voy  RCA Italiana PM45-3133
 1963 Una donna nel mondo / Perché non piango più  RCA Italiana PM45-3167
 1963 Tutta la gente / Mondo meraviglioso  RCA Italiana PM45-3169
 1963 Se mi perderai / Goccia di mare  RCA Italiana PM45-3199
 1964 Cleopatra / Non mi chiedi mai  RCA Italiana PM45-3222
 1964 Hud / Ciò che rimane alla fine di un amore  RCA Italiana PM45-3224
 1964 Con te sulla spiaggia / Mi devi credere RCA Italiana PM45-3255
 1965 A casa d'Irene / Ma dai RCA Italiana PM45-3299
 1965 L'uomo che non sapeva amare / Tu non sei l'altra  RCA Italiana PM45-3311
 1965 La voglia di ballare / Celestina RCA Italiana PM45-3314
 1966 Jean Harlow la donna che non sapeva amare / Luna malinconica (Blue Moon)  RCA Italiana PM45-3328
 1966 Lord Jim / Diciamoci ciao  RCA Italiana PM45-3338
 1966 All'ombra di una Colt / Finché il mondo sarà  RCA Italiana PM45-3340
 1966 Cammina cammina / Non scherzare con il fuoco  RCA Italiana PM45-3356
 1966 Che cos'è l'amore / File di automobili  RCA Italiana PM45-3365
 1966 Corri / Guantanamera RCA Italiana PM45-3373
 1967 Ma piano (per non svegliarmi/Una telefonata) Parade PRC 5025
 1967 Cara felicità/Siamo stati innamorati Parade PRC 5034
 1967 Qualche stupido "ti amo"(somethin'stupid)*/E venne la notte Parade PRC 5040 - *:Cantata con "Fulvia"
 1967 Ci vediamo stasera/La ballata del treno Parade PRC 5049
 1968 Va ragazzo/Legata a un granello di sabbia RCA Italiana PM 3470
 1968 La morale della favola/Sonia Fonit SPF 31225
 1969 Oramai sto con lei/Ti ricordi  RCA Italiana PM 3484
 1970 Tu ed io...io e te/Quando il treno partirà Ri-Fi RPN NP 16419
 1971 Nun è straniero/Il colore dell'addio Ri-Fi RNP NP 16452
 1971 Una stagione all'inferno/Il colore dell'addio  Ri-Fi  RPN NP 16454
 1976 Nina/Balla con me...dai - Super five record SFR 9201
 1979 Don Chuck castoro/Pierino a quadretti (con la partecipazione del coro de I castorini) - Meeting Music/CLS - MMC 101
 1979 Don Chuck story/Zawa zawa - Meeting Music/CLS - MMC 117
 1980 Arnold/Ma le gambe - Flash Cinema TV/RCA - ZBFH 7202
 1980 Fantasupermega/Godzilla - Gudzuki - Godzilla (con la partecipazione de Il coro dei bambini di Renata Cortiglioni) - CBS - CBS 8506
 1981 Stardust/Ciao Brasile! - WEA - T 18855
 1981 Jeremy and Jenny destra-sinistra/Bem - WEA -  T 18856
 1982 Hela/Microsuperman - Traccia/Fonit-Cetra - TRS 1016
 1982 Cyborg i nove supermagnifici/Chappy (I cavalieri del re) - RCA Original cast - BB 6605
 1982 Sam, il ragazzo del west/Mimì e la nazionale di pallavolo (Giorgia Lepore) -  RCA Original cast - BB 6622
 1989  Direzione vietata/sogno una sola città - Iperspazio -IPN 892

EP
1961 Exodus RCA Italiana EPA 30 - 401

Albums
1961 Nico Fidenco RCA Serie Europa PML 10131
1963 Per noi due RCA Italiana PML 10366
1963 Successi da Cinelandia RCA Italiana APLM 10390
1964 Musica per innamorati RCA Italiana APML 10399
1964 La bella musica italiana RCA Italiana QKAP 11742
1965 Nico Fidenco Show RCA Italiana Special S 5
1973 La mia estate con Cinzia - Ri-Fi - RFL ST 14046
1977 Gli anni d'oro di Nico Fidenco - RCA Lineatre/RCA - NL 33043
1981 La mia mania - WEA T 58416
1984 Super4 - Siglaquattro/RCA - SIG 1021 (with Jimmy Fontana, Gianni Meccia and Riccardo Del Turco)
1992 Ieri e oggi  - Centotre  MFLP 021
1994 - TiVulandia - volume 1 - RCA Original Cast/BMG - 74321-21094-2
1994 - TiVulandia - volume 2 - RCA Original Cast/BMG - 74321-21095-2
1996 - Legata a un granello di sabbia - Supermusic/Duck Records
2002 - Nico Fidenco - I grandi successi originali2003 - TiVulandia - volume 4'' - RCA/BMG Italia - 82876538582

Notes

External links

 

1933 births
2022 deaths
Italian musicians
Italian film score composers
Italian male film score composers
Musicians from Rome
Spaghetti Western composers
RCA Records artists